Iltisia is a genus of Central American flowering plants in the family Asteraceae.

 Species
 Iltisia echandiensis R.M.King & H.Rob. - Panamá, Costa Rica
 Iltisia repens S.F.Blake - Costa Rica

References

Asteraceae genera
Eupatorieae
Flora of Central America